Karl Ernst Haushofer (27 August 1869 – 10 March 1946) was a German general, professor, geographer, and politician. Through his student Rudolf Hess, Haushofer's conception of Geopolitik influenced the development of Adolf Hitler's expansionist strategies. He coined the political use of the term Lebensraum, which Hitler adopted in Mein Kampf and used to motivate global Nazi expansionism and genocide. Under the Nuremberg Laws, Haushofer's wife and children were categorized as Mischlinge. His son, Albrecht, was issued a German Blood Certificate through the help of Hess.

Life and career
Haushofer belonged to a family of artists and scholars. He was born in Munich to Max Haushofer, a well-known professor of economics, politician and author of both academic and literary works, and Adele Haushofer (née Fraas). On his graduation from the Munich Gymnasium (high school), in 1887, Haushofer entered the 1st Field Artillery regiment "Prinzregent Luitpold" of the Bavarian Army and completed Kriegsschule, Artillerieschule and War Academy (Kingdom of Bavaria). In 1896, he married Martha Mayer-Doss (1877–1946) whose father was Jewish. They had two sons, Albrecht Haushofer and Heinz Haushofer (1906–1988). In 1903, he accepted a teaching position at the Bavarian War Academy.

In November 1908, Haushofer was ordered to Tokyo as a military attaché to study the Imperial Japanese Army and as a military advisor in artillery instruction. He travelled with his wife via India and South East Asia and arrived in February 1909. He was received by Emperor Meiji and became acquainted with many important people in politics and the armed forces. In autumn 1909, he travelled with his wife for a month to Korea and Manchuria on the occasion of a railway construction. In June 1910, they returned to Germany via Russia and arrived one month later. However, shortly after returning to Bavaria, he began to suffer from a severe lung disease and was given a leave from the army for three years.

During his convalescence, from 1911 to 1913, Haushofer would work on his doctorate of philosophy from Munich University for a thesis on Japan titled Dai Nihon, Betrachtungen über Groß-Japans Wehrkraft, Weltstellung und Zukunft ("Reflections on Greater Japan's Military Strength, World Position, and Future"). He established himself as one of Germany’s foremost experts regarding the Far East, and co-founded the geopolitical monthly Zeitschrift für Geopolitik (ZfG), which he would co-edit until it was suspended towards the end of World War II.

Haushofer continued his career as a professional soldier after the annexation of Bavaria by Germany, serving in the army of Imperial Germany and returning to teach War History at the Military Academy in Munich. 

During World War I, he commanded a brigade on the Western Front. He retired with the rank of generalmajor (major general) in 1919, but became disillusioned by Germany's defeat and the imposition of severe sanctions.  Around the same time, he forged a friendship with the young Rudolf Hess, who would become his scientific assistant and later the deputy leader of the Nazi Party. Their familiarity formed the basis of the mistaken assumption of an equally close contact between Haushofer and Hitler.

Haushofer entered academia with the aim of restoring and regenerating Germany. He believed the Germans' lack of geographical knowledge and geopolitical awareness to be a major cause of Germany’s defeat in World War I, because Germany had found itself with a disadvantageous alignment of allies and enemies. The fields of political and geographical science thus became his areas of specialty. In 1919, Haushofer became Privatdozent for political geography at Ludwig Maximilian University of Munich, and was made a professor in 1933, although he declined a formal position and salary, because that would have affected his military pension.

From 1925 to 1931 and from 1933 to 1939, Haushofer broadcast monthly radio lectures on the international political situation. That Weltpolitischer Monatsbericht made him a household name in contemporary Germany, and he came to be known in circles far removed from academia. He was a founding member of the Deutsche Akademie, of which he served as president from 1934 to 1937. He was a prolific writer, publishing hundreds of articles, reviews, commentaries, obituaries and books, many of which were on Asian topics, and he arranged for many leaders in the Nazi party and in the German military to receive copies of his works.

Louis Pauwels, in his book Monsieur Gurdjieff, describes Haushofer as a former student of George Gurdjieff. Others, including Pauwels, said that Haushofer created a Vril society and that he was a secret member of the Thule Society. Stefan Zweig spoke warmly of him but said history would have to judge how far he knowingly contributed to Nazi doctrine, as more documentation became available. Zweig credited him with the concept of Lebensraum, used in a psychological sense of a nation's relative energies.

After the establishment of the German Nazi government, Haushofer remained friendly with Hess, who protected Haushofer's wife from the racial laws of the Nazis, which deemed her a "half-Jew". During the prewar years, Haushofer was instrumental in linking Japan to the Axis powers, acting in accordance with the theories in his book Geopolitics of the Pacific Ocean.

After the July 20 Plot to assassinate Hitler, Haushofer's son Albrecht (1903–1945) was implicated, in part because of his previous association with Hess. Albrecht went into hiding but was arrested on 7 December 1944 and put into the Moabit prison in Berlin. During the night of 22–23 April 1945, he and other prisoners, such as Klaus Bonhoeffer, were walked out of the prison by an SS squad and shot. 

Beginning on 24 September 1945, Karl Haushofer was informally interrogated by Father Edmund A. Walsh on behalf of the Allied forces to determine whether he should stand trial for war crimes. Walsh determined that he had not committed any.

On the night of 10–11 March 1946, Karl Haushofer and his wife committed suicide in a secluded hollow on their Hartschimmelhof estate at Pähl/Ammersee. Both drank arsenic and his wife then hanged herself.

Geopolitics

Haushofer developed Geopolitik from widely varied sources, including the writings of Oswald Spengler, Alexander Humboldt, Karl Ritter, Friedrich Ratzel, Rudolf Kjellén, and Halford J. Mackinder.

Geopolitik contributed to Nazi foreign policy chiefly in the strategy and justifications for lebensraum. The theories contributed five ideas to German foreign policy in the interwar period:
 organic state
 lebensraum
 autarky
 pan-regions
 land power/sea power dichotomy.

Geostrategy as a political science is both descriptive and analytical like political geography but adds a normative element in its strategic prescriptions for national policy. While some of Haushofer's ideas stem from earlier American and British geostrategy, German geopolitik adopted an essentialist outlook toward the national interest, oversimplifying issues and representing itself as a panacea. As a new and essentialist ideology, geopolitik resonated with the post-World War I insecurity of the populace.

Haushofer's position in the University of Munich served as a platform for the spread of his geopolitical ideas, magazine articles, and books. In 1922, he founded the Institute of Geopolitics in Munich, from which he proceeded to publicize geopolitical ideas. By 1924, as the leader of the German geopolitik school of thought, Haushofer would establish the Zeitschrift für Geopolitik monthly devoted to geopolitik. His ideas would reach a wider audience with the publication of Volk ohne Raum by Hans Grimm in 1926, popularizing his concept of lebensraum. Haushofer exercised influence both through his academic teachings, urging his students to think in terms of continents and emphasizing motion in international politics, and through his political activities. While Hitler's speeches would attract the masses, Haushofer's works served to bring the remaining intellectuals into the fold.

Geopolitik was essentially a consolidation and codification of older ideas, given a scientific gloss:

Lebensraum was a revised colonial imperialism;
Autarky a new expression of tariff protectionism;
Strategic control of key geographic territories exhibiting the same thought behind earlier designs on the Suez and Panama Canals; a view of controlling the land in the same way as those choke points control the sea
Pan-regions (Panideen) based upon the British Empire, and the American Monroe Doctrine, Pan-American Union and hemispheric defense, whereby the world is divided into spheres of influence.
Frontiers – His view of barriers between peoples not being political (borders) or natural placements of races or ethnicities but as being fluid and determined by the will or needs of ethnic/racial groups.
The key reorientation in each dyad is that the focus is on land-based empire rather than naval imperialism.

Ostensibly based upon the geopolitical theory of American naval expert Alfred Thayer Mahan, and British geographer Halford J. Mackinder, German geopolitik adds older German ideas. Enunciated most forcefully by Friedrich Ratzel and his Swedish student Rudolf Kjellén, they include an organic or anthropomorphized conception of the state, and the need for self-sufficiency through the top-down organization of society. The root of uniquely German geopolitik rests in the writings of Karl Ritter who first developed the organic conception of the state that would later be elaborated upon by Ratzel and accepted by Hausfhofer. He justified lebensraum, even at the cost of other nations' existence because conquest was a biological necessity for a state's growth.

Ratzel's writings coincided with the growth of German industrialism after the Franco-Prussian war and the subsequent search for markets that brought it into competition with Britain. His writings served as welcome justification for imperial expansion. Influenced by Mahan, Ratzel wrote of aspirations for German naval reach, agreeing that sea power was self-sustaining, as the profit from trade would pay for the merchant marine, unlike land power. Haushofer was exposed to Ratzel, who was friends with Haushofer's father, a teacher of economic geography, and would integrate Ratzel's ideas on the division between sea and land powers into his theories, saying that only a country with both could overcome this conflict.

Haushofer's geopolitik expands upon that of Ratzel and Kjellén. While the latter two conceive of geopolitik as the state as an organism in space put to the service of a leader, Haushofer's Munich school specifically studies geography as it relates to war and designs for empire. The behavioral rules of previous geopoliticians were thus turned into dynamic normative doctrines for action on lebensraum and world power.

Haushofer defined geopolitik in 1935 as "the duty to safeguard the right to the soil, to the land in the widest sense, not only the land within the frontiers of the Reich, but the right to the more extensive Volk and cultural lands." Culture itself was seen as the most conducive element to dynamic special expansion. It provided a guide as to the best areas for expansion, and could make expansion safe, whereas projected military or commercial power could not. Haushofer even held that urbanization was a symptom of a nation's decline, evidencing a decreasing soil mastery, birthrate and effectiveness of centralized rule.

To Haushofer, the existence of a state depended on living space, the pursuit of which must serve as the basis for all policies. Germany had a high population density, but the old colonial powers had a much lower density, a virtual mandate for German expansion into resource-rich areas. Space was seen as military protection against initial assaults from hostile neighbors with long-range weaponry. A buffer zone of territories or insignificant states on one's borders would serve to protect Germany. Closely linked to that need was Haushofer's assertion that the existence of small states was evidence of political regression and disorder in the international system. The small states surrounding Germany ought to be brought into the vital German order. These states were seen as being too small to maintain practical autonomy even if they maintained large colonial possessions and would be better served by protection and organization within Germany. In Europe, he saw Belgium, the Netherlands, Portugal, Denmark, Switzerland, Greece and the "mutilated alliance" of Austro-Hungary as supporting his assertion.

Haushofer's version of autarky was based on the quasi-Malthusian idea that the earth would become saturated with people and no longer able to provide food for all. There would essentially be no increases in productivity.

Haushofer and the Munich school of geopolitik would eventually expand their conception of lebensraum and autarky well past the borders of 1914 and "a place in the sun" to a New European Order, then to a New Afro-European Order, and eventually to a Eurasian Order. That concept became known as a pan-region, taken from the American Monroe Doctrine, and the idea of national and continental self-sufficiency. That was a forward-looking refashioning of the drive for colonies, something that geopoliticians did not see as an economic necessity but more as a matter of prestige, putting pressure on older colonial powers. The fundamental motivating force would be not economic but cultural and spiritual. Haushofer was, what is called today, a proponent of "Eurasianism", advocating a policy of German–Russian hegemony and alliance to offset an Anglo-American power structure's potentially dominating influence in Europe.

Beyond being an economic concept, pan-regions were a strategic concept as well. Haushofer acknowledges the strategic concept of the Heartland Theory put forward by the British geopolitician Halford Mackinder. If Germany could control Eastern Europe and subsequently Russian territory, it could control a strategic area to which hostile seapower could be denied. Allying with Italy and Japan would further augment German strategic control of Eurasia, with those states becoming the naval arms protecting Germany's insular position.

Contacts with Nazi leadership

Evidence points to a disconnect between the advocates of geopolitik and Hitler, although their practical tactical goals were nearly indistinguishable.

Rudolf Hess, Hitler's secretary who would assist in the writing of Mein Kampf, was a close student of Haushofer's. While Hess and Hitler were imprisoned after the Munich Beer Hall Putsch in 1923, Haushofer spent six hours visiting the two, bringing along a copy of Friedrich Ratzel's Political Geography and  Clausewitz's On War. After World War II, Haushofer would deny that he had taught Hitler, and claimed that the  National Socialist Party perverted Hess's study of geopolitik. Hitler's biographers disagree somewhat on the extent of Haushofer's influence on Hitler: Ian Kershaw writes that "[his] influence was probably greater than the Munich professor was later prepared to acknowledge," while Joachim C. Fest says that "Hitler's version of [Haushofer's] ideas was distinctly his own." Haushofer himself viewed Hitler as a half-educated man who never correctly understood the geopolitik principles explained by Hess, and saw Foreign Minister Joachim von Ribbentrop (in office: 1938-1945) as the principal distorter of geopolitik in Hitler's mind.

Although Haushofer accompanied Hess on numerous propaganda missions and participated in consultations between Nazis and Japanese leaders, he claimed that Hitler and the Nazis only seized upon half-developed ideas and catchwords. Furthermore, the Nazi party and government lacked any official organ that was receptive to geopolitik, leading to selective adoption and poor interpretation of Haushofer's theories. Ultimately, Hess and Konstantin von Neurath, the German Minister of Foreign Affairs (in office: 1932-1938), were the only officials Haushofer would admit had a proper understanding of geopolitik.

Father Edmund A. Walsh, professor of geopolitics and dean at Georgetown University, who interviewed Haushofer after the  Allied victory in preparation for the Nuremberg trials, disagreed with Haushofer's assessment that Hitler and the Nazis terribly distorted geopolitik. He cites Hitler's speeches declaring that small states have no right to exist, and the Nazi use of Haushofer's maps, language and arguments. Even if distorted somewhat, Walsh felt that was enough to implicate Haushofer's geopolitik.

Haushofer also denied assisting Hitler in writing Mein Kampf, saying that he only knew of it once it was in print, and that he never read it. Walsh found that even if Haushofer did not directly assist Hitler, discernible new elements appeared in Mein Kampf, as compared to previous speeches made by Hitler. Geopolitical ideas of lebensraum, space for  depth of defense, appeals for natural frontiers, balancing land and seapower, and geographic analysis of military strategy entered Hitler's thought between his imprisonment and the publishing of Mein Kampf. Chapter XIV, on German policy in Eastern Europe, in particular displays the influence of the materials Haushofer brought Hitler and Hess while they were imprisoned.

Haushofer was never a member of the Nazi Party, and did voice disagreements with the party, leading to his brief imprisonment. Haushofer came under suspicion because of his contacts with left-wing socialist figures within the Nazi movement (led by Gregor Strasser) and because of his advocacy of essentially a German–Russian alliance. The Nazi left-wing had some connections to the Communist Party of Germany and some of its leaders, especially those who were influenced by the National Bolshevist philosophy of a German–Russian revolutionary alliance, as advocated by Ernst Niekisch (1889-1967), Julius Evola (1898-1974), Ernst Jünger (1895-1998), Friedrich Hielscher (1902-1990) and other figures of the "conservative revolution". Haushofer did profess loyalty to the Führer and make anti-Semitic remarks on occasion. However, his emphasis was always on space over race; he believed in  environmental rather than racial determinism. He refused to associate himself with anti-Semitism as a policy, especially because his wife was half-Jewish. Haushofer admits that after 1933 much of what he wrote was distorted under duress: his wife had to be protected by Hess's influence (who managed to have her awarded "honorary German" status); his son was implicated in the July 20 plot to assassinate Hitler and was executed by the Gestapo; he himself was imprisoned in Dachau concentration camp in July and August 1944),
and his son and grandson were imprisoned for two and a half months.

Several authors have stressed the idea of contact between Haushofer and the Nazi establishment. These authors have expanded Haushofer's contact with Hitler to a close collaboration while Hitler was writing Mein Kampf and have portrayed him one of the "future Chancellor's many mentors". Suggestions include that Haushofer may have been a short-term student of Gurdjieff, that he had studied Zen Buddhism, and that he had been initiated at the hands of Tibetan lamas – although these notions are debated.

The influence of Haushofer on Nazi ideology is dramatized in the 1943 short documentary propaganda film, Plan for Destruction, which was nominated for an  Academy Award.

Works
 Das Japanische Reich in seiner geographischen Entwicklung. Wien : L. W. Seidel & Sohn, 1921.
 Geopolitik des Pazifischen Ozeans : Studien über die Wechselbeziehungen zwischen Geographie und Geschichte. Heidelberg : Kurt Vowinckel Verlag, 1925; Bremen : Dogma, 2013.
 Bausteine zur Geopolitik. Heidelberg : Kurt Vowinckel Verlag, 1928.
 Weltpolitik von heute. Berlin : Zeitgeschichte-Verlag Wilhelm Undermann, 1934 (online).
 Napoleon I. Lübeck : Coleman, 1935.
 Kitchener. Lübeck : Coleman, 1935.
 Foch. Lübeck : Coleman, 1935
 Weltmeere und Weltmächte. Berlin : Zeitgeschichte-Verlag, 1937.
 Deutsche Kulturpolitik im indopazifischen Raum. Hamburg : Hoffmann und Campe, 1939.
 Geopolitische Grundlagen. Berlin and Wien : Industrieverlag Spaeth & Linde, 1939.
 Grenzen in ihrer geographischen und politischen Bedeutung. Heidelberg, Berlin and Magdeburg : Vowinckel, 1939.
 Wehr-Geopolitik : Geogr. Grundlagen e. Wehrkunde. Berlin : Junker und Dünnhaupt, 1941.
 Japan baut sein Reich. Berlin : Zeitgeschichte-Verlag Wilhelm Undermann, 1941.
 Das Werden des deutschen Volkes: Von d. Vielfalt d. Stämme zur Einheit d. Nation. Berlin : Propyläen-Verlag, 1941.
 Der Kontinentalblock : Mitteleuropa, Eurasien, Japan. Berlin : Eher, 1941.
 Das Reich : Großdeutsches Werden im Abendland. Berlin : Habel, 1943.
 De la géopolitique. Paris : Fayard, 1986.
 English Translation and Analysis of Major General Karl Ernst Haushofer's Geopolitics of the Pacific Ocean : Studies on the Relationship between Geography and History. Lewiston, New York and Lampeter, Wales : Edwin Mellen Press, 2002. .

See also
 Geojurisprudence
 Intermediate Region
 Alfred Pringsheim
 Nazi Ideologues, Philosophers, and Sociologists

References
Notes

Bibliography
Dorpalen, Andreas.The World of General Haushofer: Geopolitics in Action (New York: Farrar & Rinehart, 1942) 
Jacobsen, Hans-Adolf.  Karl Haushofer: Leben und Werk. 2 vols. (= Schriften des Bundesarchivs 24) Harald Boldt Verlag, Boppard 1979.
 Halford Mackinder, Democratic Ideals and Reality, Washington, DC: National Defence University Press, 1996.
Mattern, Johannes, Geopolitik: Doctrine of National Self-Sufficiency and Empire, The Johns Hopkins Press, Baltimore: 1942
Ravenscroft, Trevor. "The Spear of Destiny" Weiser Books, London: 1983
Walsh, Edmund A. Total Power: A Footnote to History. Doubleday & Company, Inc., Garden City, New York: 1949

Further reading
 Bassoni, N. (2019). "Karl Haushofer as a “Pioneer” of National Socialist Cultural Diplomacy in Fascist Italy." Central European History, 52(3), 424-449. 
 Coogan, Kevin, Dreamer of the Day: Francis Parker Yockey and the postwar fascist international  (Brooklyn, NY: Autonomedia,  1998) 
 Heske, Henning, "Karl Haushofer: his role in German politics and in Nazi politics," Political Geography 6 (1987), pp. 135–144.
Kaplan, Robert D. (2012) The Revenge of Geography: What the Maps Tell Us About the Coming Conflicts and the Battle Against Fate New York: Random House. 
 Murphy, David Thomas, The Heroic Earth: Geopolitical Thought in Weimar Germany, 1918–1933 (Kent, Oh.: Kent State University Press, 1997)
 Rees, Philip (ed.), Biographical Dictionary of the Extreme Right Since 1890, 1991, 
 Spang, Christian W., "Karl Haushofer Re-examined – Geopolitics as a Factor within Japanese-German Rapprochement in the Inter-War Years?" C. W. Spang, R.-H. Wippich (eds.), Japanese-German Relations, 1895–1945. War, Diplomacy and Public Opinion. (Routledge, London/New York: 2006) pp. 139–157.
 Spang, Christian W., Karl Haushofer und Japan. Die Rezeption seiner geopolitischen Theorien in der deutschen und japanischen Politik, Munich: Iudicium, 2013. .

External links
 Deutsches Historisches Museum: Biography of Karl Haushofer (German)
 Encyclopædia Britannica entry
 The Columbia Encyclopedia, Sixth Edition entry on Karl Haushofer
 
 Geopolitics, the United States, the Eurasian Continental Bloc, and China by Bertil Haggman
 "The Last Days of World War II – Last Secrets of the Axis" – An online documentary by History Channel about Karl Haushofer and his role on Eurasia alliance
 Japan und die Japaner - eine Landes und Volkskunde (1933) at The Internet Archive
 

1869 births
1946 suicides
Bavarian generals
Dachau concentration camp survivors
Geopoliticians
German geographers
German Army generals of World War I
People of Nazi Germany
Joint suicides
Ludwig Maximilian University of Munich alumni
Academic staff of the Ludwig Maximilian University of Munich
Military geographers
German occultists
Military personnel from Munich
People from the Kingdom of Bavaria
Suicides by poison
German military attachés
German expatriates in Japan
Writers from Munich
Suicides in Germany